Nucula certisinus is a saltwater nut clam, a marine bivalve mollusc in the family Nuculidae.

References
 Powell A. W. B., New Zealand Mollusca, William Collins Publishers Ltd, Auckland, New Zealand 1979 

Nuculidae
Bivalves of New Zealand
Molluscs described in 1930
Taxa named by Harold John Finlay